Methodist Episcopal Church, South (also known as Centenary Methodist Church) is a historic church at 702 D Avenue in Lawton, Oklahoma.

It was built in 1924 in a Classical Revival style and added to the National Register in 1985.

References

Methodist churches in Oklahoma
Churches on the National Register of Historic Places in Oklahoma
Neoclassical architecture in Oklahoma
Churches completed in 1924
Buildings and structures in Comanche County, Oklahoma
National Register of Historic Places in Comanche County, Oklahoma
1924 establishments in Oklahoma
Neoclassical church buildings in the United States